This article details the qualifying phase for fencing at the 2020 Summer Olympics . Qualification was primarily based on the Fédération Internationale d'Escrime (FIE) Official Ranking, with further individual places available at four zonal qualifying tournaments.

For the team events, 8 teams qualified in each event. Each team must be composed of 3 fencers, with a fourth alternate. The top 4 ranked teams qualified. The next-best ranked team from each zone (Africa, the Americas, Europe, and Asia-Oceania) also qualified as long as it was ranked in the top 16. If a zone does not have any team ranked between fifth and sixteenth, the best-placed nation not already qualified was selected regardless of zone.

For individual events the 3 fencers from the team event will qualify for individual competition automatically. 6 more places will be awarded based on the rankings (ignoring fencers from countries with team qualifications, and considering only the top fencer from each country): the top 2 fencers from each of Europe and Asia-Oceania, and the top 1 fencer from Africa and the Americas. 4 more places (1 per zone) will be awarded through zone qualifying tournaments; only countries without a qualified fencer in an event will be eligible to participate in these zone qualifying tournaments.

The host country is entitled to 8 quota spots for individual fencers, in addition to those qualified in the above mechanism, respecting the maximum quota of athletes per country (3 per weapon). If enough of these spots will be used to bring to 3 the number of participants in an individual event, the host country will also take part in the corresponding team event, bringing the number of teams to 9. Unused host country spots, should there be any, will be awarded to other countries through the FIE universality quota and the Tripartite Commission.

French fencer Daniel Jérent initially qualified to fence in the individual and team epee events, but was banned from participating due to a positive urine test for a banned product. Jérent was replaced by Romain Cannone, who will compete in the two events in which Jérent was entered, and Ronan Gustin was recalled as a team replacement. Cannone would later go on to win the individual event.

American Alen Hadzic initially qualified to fence in team epee on Team USA as a replacement athlete. But he was suspended due to sexual misconduct from competing by the United States Center for SafeSport; he then had his suspension reduced to a lesser sanction by an arbitrator.

Timeline

Qualification summary

Men's events

Men's Individual épée

Men's Team épée

Men's Individual foil

Men's Team foil

Men's Individual sabre

Men's Team sabre

Women's events

Women's Individual épée

Women's Team épée

Women's Individual foil

Women's Team foil

Women's Individual sabre

Women's Team sabre

References

Fencing at the 2020 Summer Olympics
Qualification for the 2020 Summer Olympics